The Embassy of the United States in Beijing is the diplomatic mission of the United States in China. It serves as the administrative office of the United States Ambassador to China. The embassy complex is in Chaoyang District, Beijing.

In addition to Beijing, it covers the municipalities of Tianjin and Chongqing and the provinces of Gansu, Guizhou, Hebei, Henan, Hubei, Hunan, Inner Mongolia, Jiangxi, Ningxia, Qinghai, Shanxi, Shaanxi, Shandong, Sichuan, Tibet Autonomous Region, Xinjiang, and Yunnan.

History

The current U.S. Embassy in Beijing was opened and dedicated on August 8, 2008, by U.S. President George W. Bush and is the third largest American diplomatic mission in the world, after the Embassy of the United States, Baghdad and the Embassy of the United States, Yerevan. The U.S. embassy had its origins in 1935 when the legation was upgraded into the embassy in Nanjing. However, the central government of the nationalists was relocated to Taipei in 1949 due to the Chinese Civil War and the embassy was reopened in 1953. On January 1, 1979, the embassy was transferred to Beijing after normalizing relations with the communist government on the mainland.

The , eight story facility incorporates a great deal of free-standing transparent and opaque glass in its design. It is located on a  plot of land. The embassy warehouse is located in the Beijing Tianzhu Airport Industrial Zone in Shunyi District.

Since the embassy is legally out of reach of the Government of China, it was used as the hiding place of Chinese dissident Chen Guangcheng  after he escaped from house arrest.

Principal officers

Ambassadors

Deputy Chiefs of Mission (DCM)

See also

List of diplomatic missions of the United States
United States Ambassador to China
U.S. Consulate General Chengdu
U.S. Consulate General Guangzhou
U.S. Consulate General Shanghai
U.S. Consulate General Shenyang
U.S. Consulate General Wuhan
Consulate General of the United States, Hong Kong and Macau
Embassy of People's Republic of China in Washington, D.C.
International School of Beijing
Americans in China

Notes

References

External links

Embassy of the United States, Beijing

Beijing
China–United States relations
United States
Buildings and structures in Chaoyang District, Beijing